Ricardo Jerome "Ricky" Bordallo (– ) was an American (U.S. citizen) politician, businessman, and serving two terms as the 2nd and 4th Governor of Guam with Lieutenant Governor Rudy Sablan from 1975 to 1979, and with Lieutenant Governor Edward Diego Reyes from 1983 to 1987. A member of the Democratic Party of Guam, Bordallo previously served as a Senator in the Guam Legislature from 1957 to 1971.

Early life 
He was the son of Baltazar Jeronimo "BJ" Bordallo (August 8, 1900 – May 10, 1984), a businessman, and Josefina Torres Pangelinan (December 18, 1904 – December 2, 1945). BJ Bordallo was a popular politician from the 1930s to 1950s. Ricardo Bordallo was the first child of a family including his brother Paul Joseph Bordallo (1930–2007), who was a former senator. Ricardo Bordallo attended the University of San Francisco before returning to Guam and becoming a successful businessman and car dealer. Among other positions, he was the proprietor of "Ricky's Suburban Club," a restaurant and bar in Tamuning, Guam. Bordallo also established "Ricky's Auto Company" in the mid 1950s which became Toyota's first American car dealer.

Personal life 
He was married to Madeleine Zeien Bordallo in 1953; together they have one daughter Deborah, and one grandchild, Nicole Nelson. Bordallo's widow was an unsuccessful candidate for governor in 1990, and served as Lieutenant Governor of Guam from 1995 to 2003, and as the island's Delegate to the United States House of Representatives from 2003 until losing renomination in the 2018 election.

Political career

Senator of the Guam Legislature 
Bordallo was first elected to the Guam Legislature in 1956 as a member of the Popular Party (predecessor to the Democratic Party of Guam). Bordallo served in the territorial legislature from 1957 to 1970 and twice served as Chairman of the Democratic Party of Guam. As a senator, he introduced the law that first created an unofficial Guam delegate to the U.S. Congress.

Bordallo-Taitano Gubernatorial Ticket (1970) 
Bordallo first ran for governor in the 1970 election, which was the first election in which the people of Guam were allowed to elect their governor. He ran with Senator Richard "Dick" Taitano against two other former gubernatorial teams: Former governor Manuel Guerrero and running mate Dr. Antonio C. (Tony) Yamashita, as well as attorney and former speaker Joaquin C. "Kin" Arriola and retired judge and former senator Vicente Bamba. Bordallo-Taitano came in first in the primary election by a close margin over Guerrero-Yamashita and then won the run-off election. However, due to the contentious Democratic campaign, Bordallo-Taitano lost in the general election to the Republican team of incumbents Carlos G. Camacho and Kurt S. Moylan. The election was significant for Bordallo, however, as he and Dick Taitano created Guam's first "grassroots" political organization throughout the villages.

Governorship (1975–1979)

Bordallo-Sablan Gubernatorial Ticket (1974) 
Bordallo's wife, Madeleine, also proved to be a passionate and untiring campaigner and helped draw many supporters to the organization. This organization and base of supporters would prove valuable when Bordallo ran again in the 1974 election.  Madeleine Bordallo was most known for her humanitarian pursuits.  She sponsored many civil cultural events including the Guam Symphony and a program for instructing children in the Suzuki method of violin.

Bordallo ran for governor for a second time in 1974, this time with Rudolph "Rudy" Guerrero Sablan. They were up against four other Democratic tickets: Manuel Guerrero and running mate David D.L. Flores; Pedro C. Sanchez and Esteban U. Torres; and Joaquin C. "Kin" Arriola and Theodore "Ted" Nelson. Dick Taitano was the manager of the Bordallo-Sablan campaign and broadened the organization he had set up in 1970. This organization proved decisive, and Bordallo-Sablan easily beat the other Democratic teams.

Bordallo-Sablan then went on to beat the Camacho-Moylan team, which had just barely beat the Republican rival team of Paul Calvo and Antonio Palomo in the primary. Calvo ran as a write-in candidate in the general election, drawing support from Camacho-Moylan, and Bordallo-Sablan won by less than 600 of the 22,000-plus votes.

First term 1975–79 
Bordallo's first term in office, from 1975 to 1979, was contentious. He was characterized as highly charismatic but highly controversial. Someone wasn't afraid to speak his mind on any issue.   During this time the issue of independence, statehood, commonwealth status or continuation as a U.S. territory was put to the voters. Senator Paul Bordallo, his brother, favored independence. The voters elected to keep the status quo as a dependent territory. Bordallo was successful in securing $367 million for typhoon reconstruction, capital improvement project and Government of Guam investments. A new was secured at the Guam Memorial Hospital.

Bordallo-Sanchez Gubernatorial Ticket (1978) 
In 1978, Bordallo ran for re-election with a former University of Guam president Dr. Pedro C. Sanchez as his running mate for lieutenant governor. Lieutenant Governor Sablan declared his candidacy for the gubernatorial election and was a candidate in the September 1978 Democratic primary, along with his running mate for Lt. Governor was Attorney Jose Iglesias Leon Guerrero. Bordallo won the Democratic primary and defeated the Sablan-Leon Guerrero campaign with more votes. However, Bordallo lost to the Republican Calvo-Ada team in the gubernatorial general election.

Governorship (1983–1987)

Bordallo-Reyes Gubernatorial Ticket (1982) 
Bordallo ran for a third time political arena in 1982 with a political unknown, Air Force Colonel Eddie Reyes, as his running mate. He beat out Democrats Carl Gutierrez and John P. Aguon for the Democratic nomination and won office yet again. Promising to guide Guam out of the recession and push for commonwealth status, the Bordallo/Reyes ticket defeated incumbent Governor Calvo in the 1982 elections.

Second term 1983–87 
Bordallo's second term in office, from 1983 to 1987. During his second term, Bordallo chaired the Commission for Self-Determination and spearheaded the drafting of the Guam Commonwealth Act developed by June 4, 1986. He addressed Guam's education problems with his 1983 "Blueprint for Excellence" and worked on the accreditation status of the University of Guam. He went to Washington D.C. on January 20, 1985, with congressman Ben Blaz at the Officers Club, and Andrews Air Force Base.

Bordallo-Reyes Gubernatorial Ticket (1986) 
Bordallo sought re-election with Lt. Gov Edward D. Reyes as his running mate. The ticket won the Democratic nomination when they defeated by Senator Gutierrez and Senator John P. Aguon in the primary election. Bordallo lost the general election to former Lieutenant Governor Ada and Senator Frank F. Blas in the general election.

Post-governorship

Criminal conviction 
In February 1987, Bordallo was convicted on ten counts of corruption and was sentenced to nine years in prison and fined more than $100,000. He was accused of receiving over $100,000 worth of bribes and extortion in connection with favors he performed in office for campaign contributions. His convictions on eight counts of bribery and extortion were overturned in August 1988, leaving charges of obstruction of justice and witness tampering. On December 13, 1989, he was sentenced to four years in prison on the remaining charges.

Suicide 
After his failed appeal to the U.S. Supreme Court, Bordallo faced a four-year sentence in a federal minimum-security prison beginning on February 1, 1990. He had also set up four placards around the monument, one of which paraphrased the last words of Nathan Hale: "I regret that I only have one life to give to my island."

Bordallo died of massive brain damage at 4:28 P.M. at Naval Hospital, aged 62. He was buried at Pigo Cemetery in western Hagåtña.

Honors 

In January 1997, the territorial administration facility was officially named as Ricardo J. Bordallo Governor's Complex in his honor.

Electoral history

References

External links 
 Ricardo Bordallo Bio at Guampedia, Guam's Online Encyclopedia
 

|-

|-

|-

|-

1927 births
1990 suicides
20th-century American politicians
Chamorro people
Democratic Party governors of Guam
Governors of Guam
Guamanian Democrats
Guamanian politicians convicted of crimes
Members of the Legislature of Guam
People from Hagåtña, Guam
Politicians convicted of program bribery
Politicians who committed suicide
Suicides by firearm in Guam
University of San Francisco alumni